KFRE-TV (channel 59) is a television station licensed to Sanger, California, United States, serving the Fresno area as an affiliate of The CW. It is owned by Sinclair Broadcast Group alongside Visalia-licensed Fox affiliate KMPH-TV (channel 26). Both stations share studios on McKinley Avenue in eastern Fresno, while KFRE-TV's transmitter is located on Bear Mountain (near Meadow Lakes).

History

Early years
The station first signed on the air on July 17, 1985, as KMSG-TV; it originally operated as a religious independent mostly with shows like The PTL Club, The 700 Club, Richard Roberts, Jimmy Swaggart, and others as well as Home Shopping Network programming during the overnight hours. This station signed on just as KAIL (then on channel 53, now on channel 7) was evolving from religious to more of a general entertainment format. By 1987, the station evolved into a Spanish-language format during the afternoon and evening hours, and English-language religious programs for about eight hours a day each morning. The station's Spanish programming was sourced from NetSpan, the second Spanish-language television network to launch in the United States (after the Spanish International Network, now Univision); NetSpan was relaunched as Telemundo in 1987. By 1989, the station gradually dropped its inventory of English-language religious programs, and exclusively affiliated with Telemundo.

WB affiliation

In 2000, KNSO (channel 51, then an affiliate of The WB) signed a deal to become the Fresno market's new Telemundo affiliate; as a result, Pappas Telecasting terminated a local marketing agreement (LMA) between KNSO and Fox affiliate KMPH (channel 26). On January 1, 2001, the LMA with KMPH was transferred to KMSG, which also resulted in the WB affiliation moving to the station from KNSO (becoming the network's third affiliate in the market; The WB's original Fresno affiliate was Clovis-based KGMC (channel 43), which was with the network from its launch in 1995 until 1997); channel 59 also changed its call letters to KFRE-TV (the KFRE calls were originally used in the market on what is now ABC owned-and-operated station KFSN-TV (channel 30) from 1956 to 1971). With the affiliation switch, the station changed its on-air branding to "WB 59".

Pappas Telecasting purchased KFRE outright in 2002, creating the first television duopoly in the market with KMPH. In 2003, KFRE acquired the rights to Fox's FoxBox (later 4Kids TV) children's program block from KMPH, airing the block normally aired on Saturdays on a tape delay on Sunday mornings (this resulted in KFRE carrying children's blocks from two major networks, as it already carried The WB's Kids' WB block). The station continued to carry 4Kids TV until the block was discontinued by Fox in December 2008 due to a dispute with the block's lessee 4Kids Entertainment; KFRE-TV now airs Fox's Saturday morning infomercial block Weekend Marketplace, in 4Kids TV's former Sunday morning timeslot on the station.

CW affiliation

On January 24, 2006, the Warner Bros. unit of Time Warner and CBS Corporation announced that the two companies would shut down The WB and UPN and combine the networks' respective programming to create a new "fifth" network called The CW. KFRE became the market's CW affiliate when the network launched on September 18, 2006.

On May 10, 2008, thirteen Pappas stations, including KFRE, filed for Chapter 11 bankruptcy protection. As a result of the bankruptcy, Pappas Telecasting Companies was given until February 15, 2009, to sell these stations to other owners. On January 16, 2009, Pappas announced that most of the stations, including KFRE, would be purchased by New World TV Group, after the sale received United States bankruptcy court approval; the stations would eventually come under the Titan TV Broadcast Group banner. Titan announced the sale of KFRE-TV, KMPH-TV and most of the company's other stations to the Sinclair Broadcast Group on June 3, 2013. The Federal Communications Commission approved the sale on September 19, and the sale was finalized on October 3.

KFRE-TV has been digital-only since June 12, 2009.

KFRE-TV began airing programming from the American Sports Network syndication package of sports on August 30, 2014, but does not carry its successor channel, Stadium; it is instead seen on KMPH's .5 subchannel.

Programming
KFRE formerly served as the local television broadcaster of Fresno State Bulldogs sporting events until 2008, when the rights moved to then-MyNetworkTV affiliate KAIL (channel 53, now a TCT O&O on channel 7). The station was also the local holder of television rights to San Francisco Giants baseball games until the 2007 season; in 2008, the Giants telecasts also moved to KAIL. In 2008, the station held the local rights to Oakland Athletics baseball telecasts, which are produced by regional sports network Comcast SportsNet Bay Area before moving exclusively to Comcast SportsNet California in 2009. Since 2014, KFRE has aired pre-season San Francisco 49ers football games.

Newscasts
On January 10, 2006, sister station KMPH-TV began producing a half-hour 11:00 p.m. newscast for KFRE-TV; the nightly program was anchored by Allison Ruddell on Monday through Friday nights and Derrol Nail on Saturdays and Sundays. The program was unable to compete with the longer established 11:00 p.m. newscasts on KFSN-TV, NBC affiliate KSEE (channel 24) and KGPE (channel 47), and was canceled on February 5, 2007, due to low ratings. Ruddell was reassigned to anchor KMPH's 11:30 a.m. newscast, before leaving the station in July 2007; Nail, meanwhile, left channel 26 in January 2008. The station currently airs a rebroadcast of KMPH's prime time newscast, the Ten O'Clock News, each weeknight at 1:30 a.m.

Technical information

Subchannels
The station's ATSC 1.0 channels are carried on the multiplexed digital signals of other Fresno television stations:

ATSC 3.0 lighthouse

References

External links

ATSC 3.0 television stations
The CW affiliates
Charge! (TV network) affiliates
TBD (TV network) affiliates
FRE-TV
Sinclair Broadcast Group
Pappas Telecasting
1985 establishments in California
Television channels and stations established in 1985
Companies that filed for Chapter 11 bankruptcy in 2008